Ceratobasidium ramicola is a fungal plant pathogen.

References

Fungal plant pathogens and diseases
Cantharellales
Fungi described in 1969